Harris may refer to:

Places

Canada
 Harris, Ontario
 Northland Pyrite Mine (also known as Harris Mine)
 Harris, Saskatchewan
 Rural Municipality of Harris No. 316, Saskatchewan

Scotland
 Harris, Outer Hebrides (sometimes called the Isle of Harris), part of Lewis and Harris, Outer Hebrides
 Harris, Rùm, a place on Rùm, Highland

United States
 Harris, Indiana
 Harris, Iowa
 Harris, Kansas
 Harris Township, Michigan
 Harris, Minnesota
 Harris, Missouri
 Harris, New York
 Harris, North Carolina
 Harris, Oregon
 Harris, Wisconsin

Elsewhere
 Harris, Montserrat

Other places with "Harris" in the name
 Harrisonburg, Louisiana
 Harrisonburg, Virginia
 Harris County (disambiguation)
 Harris Lake (disambiguation)
 Harris Mountain (disambiguation)
 Harris Township (disambiguation)
 Harrisburg (disambiguation)
 Harrison (disambiguation)
 Harrisville (disambiguation)

People
 Harris (Essex cricketer)
 Harris Jayaraj, an Indian music director 
 Harris (given name), including a list of people with the given name
 List of people with surname Harris
 Harris (surname), a family last name

Music
 Harris (band), an American rock band

Titles
 Baron Harris, a title in the Peerage of the United Kingdom, created in 1815 for General Sir George Harris
 Harris baronets, any of four Baronetcies created for persons with the surname Harris, two in the Baronetage of England and two in the Baronetage of the United Kingdom
 Harris is also the surname of the Earls of Malmesbury in the Peerage of Great Britain, created in 1800 for diplomat Sir James Harris

Buildings
 Harris Building (disambiguation)
 Harris Museum, Preston, Lancashire, England
 Harris Theater (Chicago), United States
 Harris Theater (Pittsburgh), United States
 Harris & Ewing Photographic Studio, Washington, D.C., United States

Companies
 BMO Harris Bank, an American subsidiary of Bank of Montreal
 Harris Company, operators of a defunct American department store chain
 Harris Corporation, an American defense contractor
 Harris Farm Markets, an Australian grocery chain
 Harris Interactive, an American market research company
 Harris Performance Products, an English motorcycle racing manufacturer
 Harris Publications, an American comic and magazine publishing company
 Harris Ranch, an American Beef producer

Education

United Kingdom 
 Harris Academy, a secondary school in Dundee, Scotland
 Harris Church of England Academy, a secondary school in Rugby, England
 Harris Federation, a federation of secondary school academies in South London, England. Consisting of the following schools:
 Harris Academy Bermondsey
 Harris Academy Chafford Hundred
 Harris City Academy Crystal Palace, the flagship academy of the Federation
 Harris Girls' Academy East Dulwich
 Harris Boys' Academy East Dulwich
 Harris Academy Falconwood
 Harris Academy Merton
 Harris Academy Peckham
 Harris Academy Purley
 Harris Academy South Norwood

United States 
 Harris–Stowe State University, Missouri

Other uses
 Harris affine region detector, an algorithm
 Harris energy functional, an approximation named after J. Harris (physicist) which is used in density functional theory of quantum mechanics
 Harris's hawk, Parabuteo unicinctus, a bird of prey
 Harris operator, a corner detection algorithm
 Harris (train), a type of train on the Melbourne metropolitan railway
 Harris City (disambiguation)
 Harris Tweed (disambiguation)
 Mrs. Harris, a 2005 television film

See also
 Haris (disambiguation)
 Harish (disambiguation)
 Harries, a surname
 Justice Harris (disambiguation)